Fendi Onobun (born November 17, 1986) is a former American football tight end. He was drafted by the St. Louis Rams in the sixth round of the 2010 NFL Draft. He played college football at Houston. He has also been a member of the Seattle Seahawks, Washington Redskins and Chicago Bears.

College career 
Onobun began his college career playing basketball at The University of Arizona in 2006.  He was recruited by Lute Olson.

Onobun played four years of basketball at the University of Arizona. He joined the Houston Cougars football team in 2009 and played an important role on special teams. He appeared in 11 games and hauled in a 15-yard catch against SMU for the first reception of his career. Onobun blocked two extra points against C-USA rival Southern Miss and caught an 18-yard touchdown against Memphis.

Professional career

St. Louis Rams 
Onobun signed a four-year $1.92 million deal with a signing bonus of $129,000. Onobun, considered a risky pick, made the St. Louis Rams opening day roster in 2010. He was waived during final cuts on September 3, 2011.

Seattle Seahawks 
On September 13, 2011, the Seattle Seahawks signed Onobun to their practice squad.

Jacksonville Jaguars 
The Jacksonville Jaguars signed Onobun off of the Washington Redskins' practice squad on November 14, 2011. He was waived on December 6.

Buffalo Bills 
The Buffalo Bills signed Onobun on December 9, 2011. He was cut on August 26, 2012.

Chicago Bears 
On January 10, 2013, the Chicago Bears signed Onobun. Onobun was cut on August 30, 2013. On September 1, Onobun was signed to the Bears practice squad. Onobun was cut on June 19, 2014.

Second stint with Jaguars 
Onobun was signed by the Jaguars on August 7, 2014. He was waived/injured on August 20 and spent the season on injured reserve. He became a free agent after the 2014 season.

References

External links 
 Chicago Bears bio
 St. Louis Rams bio
 Houston Cougars bio

Living people
1986 births
American football tight ends
American men's basketball players
American sportspeople of Nigerian descent
Arizona Wildcats men's basketball players
Basketball players from Houston
Buffalo Bills players
Chicago Bears players
Houston Cougars football players
Jacksonville Jaguars players
Players of American football from Houston
Seattle Seahawks players
St. Louis Rams players
Washington Redskins players